Gunnel Märtha Ingegärd Lindblom (18 December 1931 – 24 January 2021) was a Swedish film actress and director.

Career
As an actress, Lindblom was particularly associated with the work of Ingmar Bergman, though in 1965 she performed the lead role in Miss Julie for BBC Television. She also played the key role of The Mummy in Bergman's staging of Strindberg's The Ghost Sonata in 1998–2000, a performance that earned her much critical acclaim.

She appeared on stage as Tintomara's mother in Carl Almqvist's play Drottningens juvelsmycke (English: The Queen's Tiara), staged at Dramaten for the theatre's 100-year jubilee in 2008. In 2009, she directed the Jon Fosse play Flicka i gul regnjacka (Girl in Yellow Raincoat) at the Royal Dramatic Theatre, starring Stina Ekblad and Irene Lindh, which premiered on 9 October.

Lindblom married physician, Sture Helander, whom she first met following her admission to hospital suffering from appendicitis during the shooting of The Virgin Spring. The couple had three children together, but divorced in 1970. Lindblom then married Frederik Dessau, a Danish director. Her second marriage was dissolved five years later. Lindblom died on 24 January 2021 after a bout of illness.

Selected filmography

 Love (1952)
 The Girl in the Rain (1955)
 The Song of the Scarlet Flower (1956)
 The Seventh Seal (1957)
 Wild Strawberries (1957)
 The Venetian (1958)
 Rabies (1958)
 The Virgin Spring (1960)
 Good Friends and Faithful Neighbours (1960)
 Winter Light (1962)
 The Silence (1963)
 Loving Couples (1964)
 Hunger (1966)
 Woman of Darkness (1966)
 The Vicious Circle (1967)
 The Girls (1968)
 Scenes from a Marriage (1973)
 Paradise Place (Paradistorg, also director, 1977)
 Sally and Freedom (1981)
 The Girl with the Dragon Tattoo (2009)

References

External links

1931 births
2021 deaths
20th-century Swedish actresses
21st-century Swedish actresses
Eugene O'Neill Award winners
Swedish film actresses
Swedish film directors
Actors from Gothenburg